Thomas Jenkins (31 January 1871 – 28 May 1955) was a missionary bishop of The Episcopal Church, serving Nevada from 1929 to 1942 and later in Oregon.

Education
Jenkins was born on January 31, 1871, in Shenley, Hertfordshire, England, the son of John Jenkins and Mary Ann Boyles.  He emigrated to the United States at the age of 19. He studied at Kenyon College and Bexley Hall from where he graduated with a Bachelor of Divinity in 1914 and a Doctor of Divinity in 1924.

Ordination
Jenkins was ordained deacon in 1900 and priest in 1901. He was involved in missionary work as a member of the Cincinnati Associate Mission, between 1900 and 1902. He was also a missionary in Alaska from 1902 till 1910. He served as rector of St Paul's Church in Fremont, Ohio between 1910 and 1915 and later as rector of St David's Church in Portland, Oregon till 1925. In 1925 he became General missionary and educational secretary of the Diocese of Oregon.

Bishop
In 1928 Jenkins was elected missionary Bishop of Nevada and was consecrated on January 25, 1929, in Trinity Church in Portland, Oregon. He remained in Nevada till May 1942 when he resigned. After his retirement he wrote the biography of Bishop Peter Trimble Rowe of Alaska and spent time doing missionary work in Oregon. He became assistant bishop of the Episcopal Diocese of Long Island in 1946, a post he held till 1949.

Personal life
Jenkins married Ruth Mary Prichard on August 15, 1901. After her death, he married Edith Smith in May 1942.

References 

1871 births
1955 deaths
Episcopal bishops of Nevada